Thomas William Chester-Master, senior (25 May 1815 – 31 January 1899)

Thomas was the eldest son of Colonel William Chester-Master by Isabella-Margaret, daughter of Colonel the Hon. Stephen Digby.

He married in 1840, the daughter of Sir George Cornewall, baronet, MP, of Moccas Court, Herefordshire. His family had originally settled in Kent during the English civil wars. But moved to the Three Counties, and held lands in Gloucestershire and Herefordshire, including the ancient medieval Abbey of Gloucester.   Lord Seymour, the Marquess of Hertford, had been declared a traitor by bill of Attainder, rendered forfeit his vast estates and titles by Queen Elizabeth I's parliament.  The Master family acquired the estates in 1864.

Master was a traditional Conservative MP of conventional 'strictly conservative' opinions.  He was returned as MP for Cirencester in 1837, considered an unreformed  wool town quite unaffected by the Great Reform Act 1832.  However he was unhappy in parliament and accepted the Chiltern Hundreds in July 1844.  In London he lived at 32a Mount Street, and was a member of the Carlton Club.

A successful businessman he purchased Knole Park, on the Downs near Bristol. His son, Thomas, junior was also an MP.

References

Bibliography

External links 
 

1815 births
1899 deaths
UK MPs 1837–1841
Conservative Party (UK) MPs for English constituencies
19th-century English businesspeople
UK MPs 1841–1847